Joaquín Casillas Lumpuy (November 24, 1907January 2, 1959) was a soldier, and commanding officer, in the Cuban Constitutional Army who in 1948 was convicted of murdering the union leader Jesús Menéndez. He was summarily executed on the day of the triumph of the Cuban Revolution.

Biography 

Joaquín Casillas made himself known after the assassination of influential sugar union leader and congressman Jesús Menéndez on January 22 of 1948, during the presidency of Ramón Grau.

Jesús Menéndez had redoubled union efforts against the government due to the drastic reduction in the percentage of the "sugar differential," a historic labor achievement that kept the price of sugar and wages up to date. The government then ordered his arrest, because of the obvious act of provocation. Menéndez felt that he was able to lead Union demonstrations against the government without fear of retaliation from the government due to the immunity that he enjoyed from his capacity as representative to the Chamber for the Popular Socialist Party.

On the 22nd of January 1948, then Captain Joaquín Casillas got on the train in Manzanillo, Cuba in which Menéndez was traveling in with the intention of arresting him. Due to his immunity, the union leader rejected the arrest order as illegal and refused to follow the soldier, turning his back to him. Casillas then shot him in the back, killing him. Captain Casillas was tried and found guilty of the murder in case 91 of 1948. The lawyer for the Menéndez family was Carlos Rafael Rodríguez.

Casillas's defense attorney during the case was José Miró Cardona, who between January 5 and February 16 of 1959 would be the first prime minister of the Cuban Revolution, and later in Miami, Florida he would be the leader of a Cuban exile committee called the Cuban Revolutionary Council.
Soon Casillas was released.

In 1958, during the Cuban Revolution, Colonel Joaquín Casillas received the order from President Fulgencio Batista to defend Santa Clara and stop the 26th of July Movement guerrillas that were advancing on Havana. On January 1, 1959, after the Battle of Santa Clara, Casillas was detained by guerrilla fighters under the command of Che Guevara. He was summarily executed the next day.

References 

1907 births
1959 deaths
People from Sancti Spíritus
Cuban military personnel
Cuban anti-communists
Cuban people convicted of murder
Executed Cuban people
People of the Cuban Revolution
1950s in Cuba
People executed by Cuba by firing squad